Hibbertia monogyna is a species of flowering plant in the family Dilleniaceae and is endemic to south-eastern Australia. It is an erect, mostly glabrous shrub with linear to wedge-shaped or spatula-shaped leaves and yellow flowers with ten to twelve stamens arranged around a single glabrous carpel.

Description
The edges of the leaves curve downwards and there are sometimes teeth near the tip. There are ten to twelve stamens arranged around the single glabrous carpel. Flowering occurs in September and October.

Taxonomy
Hibbertia monogyna was first formally described in 1817 by Augustin Pyramus de Candolle in his Regni Vegetabilis Systema Naturale from an unpublished description by Robert Brown.

Distribution and habitat
This hibbertia grows in forest on hillsides south from the Goonoo Important Bird Area near Dubbo to the far north-east corner of Victoria.

References

monogyna
Flora of New South Wales
Flora of Victoria (Australia)
Plants described in 1817
Taxa named by Augustin Pyramus de Candolle